Markvartice is a municipality and village in Třebíč District in the Vysočina Region of the Czech Republic. It has about 300 inhabitants.

History
The first written mention of Markvartice is from 1371.

References

Villages in Třebíč District